The 2022 Women's Indoor Hockey Asia Cup is the eighth edition of the Women's Indoor Hockey Asia Cup, the biennial international women's indoor hockey championship of Asia organized by the Asian Hockey Federation. It is held alongside the men's tournament at the Indoor Stadium Huamark in Bangkok, Thailand from 8 to 15 August 2022.

Thailand who were runner-ups in the previous edition successfully won their first title after four failed attempts previously after defeating Indonesia who also managed to reached their first finals as well be in the top 4, by winning 2–1. Malaysia successfully managed to win against the defending champions, Kazakhstan, by 2–0 and reclaimed the bronze medal after failing to do so in the previous edition.

Teams

Preliminary round

Pool A

Pool B

Fifth to eighth place classification

Bracket

5–8th place semi-finals

Seventh place match

Fifth place match

First to fourth place classification

Bracket

Semi-finals

Third place match

Final

Final standing

See also
 2022 Men's Indoor Hockey Asia Cup
 2022 Women's Hockey Asia Cup

References

Women's Indoor Hockey Asia Cup
Indoor Asia Cup
International women's field hockey competitions hosted by Thailand
Indoor Hockey Asia Cup
Indoor Hockey Asia Cup
Indoor Hockey Asia Cup
Asia Cup